Yadkinville is a town in Yadkin County, North Carolina, United States. The population was 2,995 at the 2020 census. Located in the Piedmont Triad, it is the county seat and largest city of Yadkin County.

History
The area was chosen as the county seat with the founding of Yadkin County in 1850. It was first known as Wilson, in honor of Louis D. Wilson, a legislator who died in the Mexican War. However, the name was changed to Yadkinville in 1852 after it was discovered that another area, Wilson, North Carolina, already had the name. At the time the county seat was established, there was only one house in town. Yadkinville was incorporated in 1857.

The first courthouse, a two-story brick building, was built in 1853 by William White of Hamptonville, North Carolina. The bricks were handmade on a farm north of town. The courthouse was torn down in 1958 and a new building was constructed.

The Second Yadkin County Jail was listed on the National Register of Historic Places in 1988.

Geography

Demographics

2020 census

As of the 2020 United States census, there were 2,995 people, 1,161 households, and 599 families residing in the town.

2000 census
According to the 2000 census, there were 2,818 people, 959 households, and 641 families residing in the town. The population density was 1,034.2 people per square mile (400.0/km2). There were 1,026 housing units at an average density of 376.5 per square mile (145.6/km2). The racial makeup of the town was 85.84% White, 6.53% African American, 0.04% Native American, 0.18% Asian, 6.32% from other races, and 1.10% from two or more races. Hispanic or Latino of any race were 18.81% of the population.

There were 959 households; 30.4% had children under the age of 18 living with them, 49.8% were married couples living together, 11.6% had a female householder with no husband present, and 33.1% were non-families. 30.2% of all households were made up of individuals, and 14.3% had someone living alone who was 65 years of age or older. The average household size was 2.51, and the average family size was 3.10.

In the town, the population was spread out, with 23.0% under the age of 18, 8.1% from 18 to 24, 27.3% from 25 to 44, 20.4% from 45 to 64, and 21.3% who were 65 years of age or older. The median age was 39 years. For every 100 females, there were 91.8 males. For every 100 females age 18 and over, there were 85.6 males.

The median income for a household in the town was $31,250, and the median income for a family was $45,000. Males had a median income of $25,172 versus $25,273 for females. The per capita income for the town was $14,792. About 10.6% of families and 14.4% of the population were below the poverty line, including 19.1% of those under age 18 and 13.9% of those age 65 or over.

Arts and culture 

Yadkinville is known locally for its "Harvest Festival" and "Grape Festival," which honors the Yadkin Valley Vineyards as well as other vineyards around North Carolina and Virginia.

Notable person
Mo Cowan, United States Senator from Massachusetts

References

External links
 Official Town of Yadkinville Website
 Yadkin County Chamber of Commerce

Towns in Yadkin County, North Carolina
Towns in North Carolina
County seats in North Carolina
Populated places established in 1850
1850 establishments in North Carolina